Stuffed apples  are made of apples stuffed with meat (lamb) and rice.  The ingredients typically include green apples, minced meat, rice, onion, tomato paste, parsley, mint, cinnamon, salt, black pepper, and vegetable oil.

See also
 List of stuffed dishes

References

Azerbaijani cuisine
Balkan cuisine
Turkish cuisine dolmas and sarmas
Rice dishes
Lamb dishes